Genesis EP is the second EP by American R&B recording artist Sisqó, released on November 29, 2019, under Dragon Music Group to celebrate the 20th anniversary of the release of his debut solo album, Unleash the Dragon.

Background
The album was confirmed in early November 2019 while Sisqó was touring Australia during the RNB Fridays Live festival that the album would be released on Black Friday.

Sisqó performed Drag/On as part of his set and solo performance while touring with Dru Hill leading up to the release.

Track listing

Release history

References

Sisqó albums
2019 EPs